Karpenko (Ukrainian, Russian: Карпе́нко) or Karpienka is a Ukrainian surname. Notable people with the surname include:
 Alexey Karpenko (also Oleksiy Viktorovych Karpenko, born 1949), Ukrainian psychophysiologist and cell transplantologist
 Andrey Karpenko (born 1966), Soviet and Russian footballer and football functionary
 Hienadź Karpienka (1949–1999), Belarusian scientist and politician
 Igor Karpenko (born 1976), Ukrainian ice hockey goaltender
 Nikolay Karpenko (born 1981), Kazakh ski jumper
 Olena Karpenko (stage-name Solomia, born 1981), Ukrainian singer, composer and poet
 Serhiy Karpenko (born 1981), Ukrainian footballer
 Valentyna Karpenko (born 1972), road cyclist from Ukraine
 Victor Karpenko (born 1977), Uzbek footballer
 Viktoria Karpenko (born 1981), Ukrainian and Bulgarian gymnast

See also
 

Ukrainian-language surnames
Surnames of Ukrainian origin